Donald Joseph White, "DONDI"  (April 7, 1961 – October 2, 1998) was an American graffiti artist.

Biography

Early life
Born in the East New York neighborhood of Brooklyn, Dondi was the youngest of five children. He was of African American and Italian American descent. He attended a Catholic school during his sophomore years. By 1975, East New York became an unstable region with racial tensions and social conflicts such as the prominence of gangs. In an interview with Zephyr, Dondi stated that he had joined several gangs in the 1970s to avoid being attacked. Anxious to leave high school behind, he earned his GED in 1984, took a job in a government office, and began to indulge his interest in graffiti.

Graffiti
Graffiti became a serious part of Dondi's life in the mid-1970s. He tagged using "NACO" and "DONDI", and worked on refining his style, gradually moving from simple tagging to building more elaborate pieces. Using the name Dondi (a version of his own name) was considered very risky at the time, as the Metropolitan Transportation Authority and the New York Police Department (NYPD) were trying to crack down on writers. In 1979, Dondi officially adopted his name when he painted a giant piece on the roof of his house.

He became a member of TOP crew (The Odd Partners) in 1977. In 1978, Dondi formed his own crew, named CIA (Crazy Inside Artists), which included other prominent artists such as his good friend DURO. For the next 20-odd years, Dondi became recognized as the stylistic standard, influencing generations of graffiti writers.

Dondi pioneered many of the styles and techniques still used by modern graffiti artists. Though he would often do wildstyle pieces for the benefit of other writers (like the famous 2MANY piece), he wanted the public to be able to read and enjoy his work, so he would focus on readable letters with intricate fills and characters.

His most famous work was Children of the Grave Parts 1, 2 and 3—three whole cars on the New York City Subway in the years 1978 through 1980. The name of the piece was taken from a Black Sabbath song. Journalist Martha Cooper filmed the final piece from start to finish. On this last piece, Dondi adopted the cartoon characters from the late Vaughn Bode. He later painted a version of Children of the Grave 3 in a studio.

He was the first graffiti artist to have a one-man show in the Netherlands and Germany, and his work is collected by European museums.

As attested by newspapers and magazines of the early 1980s, like People magazine  he worked with the Fun Gallery and together with artists of the like of Jean-Michel Basquiat, Lee Quinones, Keith Haring, ERO (Dominique Philbert), Rammellzee, Fab 5 Freddy, Futura 2000, Toxic, Zephyr, and others, he brought Graffiti art from the streets to art galleries, and museums of the United States, Europe, and Japan.

Death
Dondi died of AIDS on October 2, 1998.

Legacy
Dondi had no children but his family, including brother Michael White and his son Mike White have been moving his legacy forward. Dondi left behind hundreds of paintings and drawings, the ownership of which is still being disputed. Zephyr, IZ the Wiz, Doc and Keo painted tribute murals between 1998 and 2000. The glass-pipe artist Marbleslinger features a Dondi stencil on a series of pieces from 2008.

Dondi was featured on a Converse shoe as part of the Product Red project (2007) as well as on a capsule clothing line by Kool Sugar Apparel that was to be available in 2016. Parts of the proceeds are going to an AIDS charity.
In 2019 the Dondi White Foundation partnered with Virgil Abloh for his Off-White clothing line.

In January 2018 on an Artnet auction, a 1984 Dondi painting, titled Solid Formation, estimated between $50,000 and $70,000 USDm sold for US$240,000.

Media

Exhibitions and appearances
 Martha Cooper and the Radiant Children (1979)
 Esses Studio (1980)
 New York/New Wave (1981)
 Fun Gallery (1982)
 New York City Rap Tour (1982)
 Yaki Kornblit Gallery (1983)
 Fun Gallery (2) (1983)
 Museum Boijmans - Van Beuningen (1983)
 European Museum Shows (1983–85)
 56 Bleecker Gallery (1987)
 The Rempire Show (1992)
 Groninger Museum Retrospective (1992)
 * GHOST Galerie DONDISM (Marseille; 2018)
 Musee des Monuments Francais (Paris)

Film
 Dreams Don't Die (1982)
 Style Wars (1983)
 Wild Style (1983)

References

Bibliography
 Andrew Witten and Michael White, Dondi White Style Master General: The Life of Graffiti Artist Dondi White, New York: Regan/HarperCollins Books, 2001.  - see Zephyr
 Dondism : Retrospective Exhibition - GHOST galerie, Marseille

External links
 Dondi White Foundation
 Dondi White @ 149st

1961 births
1998 deaths
20th-century African-American painters
20th-century American male artists
20th-century American painters
American graffiti artists
American male painters
American people of Italian descent
AIDS-related deaths in New York (state)
People from Brooklyn